Western Plains USD 106 is a public unified school district headquartered in Ransom, Kansas, United States.  The district includes the communities of Ransom, Arnold, Bazine, Brownell, Utica, and nearby rural areas.

Schools
The school district operates the following schools:
 Western Plains High School in Ransom
 Western Plains South Elementary/Junior High School in Bazine
 Western Plains North Elementary School in Ransom

History
It was formed in 2004 by the consolidation of Ransom USD 302 and Bazine USD 304. In 2005 NesTre La Go USD 301 dissolved, and most of its students moved to USD 106.

See also
 Kansas State Department of Education
 Kansas State High School Activities Association
 List of high schools in Kansas
 List of unified school districts in Kansas

References

External links
 

School districts in Kansas
School districts established in 2004
2004 establishments in Kansas
Ness County, Kansas